My Wife's Diary (German: Tagebuch meiner Frau) is a 1920 German silent drama film directed by Paul L. Stein and starring Alfred Abel and Heinrich Schroth.

Cast
 Alfred Abel
 Erra Bognar
 Gertrude Hoffman
 Willy Kaiser-Heyl
 Heinrich Schroth

References

Bibliography
 Grange, William. Cultural Chronicle of the Weimar Republic. Scarecrow Press, 2008.

External links

1920 films
Films of the Weimar Republic
Films directed by Paul L. Stein
German silent feature films
1920 drama films
German drama films
German black-and-white films
Silent drama films
1920s German films